Laclede Gas Company is the largest natural gas distribution utility in Missouri, serving about 632,000 residential, commercial and industrial customers in the city of St. Louis and ten counties in eastern Missouri. As an adjunct to its gas distribution business, the company operates an underground natural gas storage field, a propane storage cavern, and propane vaporization facilities.

Laclede Gas is a regulated public utility and a wholly owned subsidiary of Spire Inc (formerly Laclede Group). Its corporate headquarters is located in the 700 Market building in downtown St. Louis.

History

It was founded as the Laclede Gas Light Company, as the invention of gas lit street and home lamps was a primary, and innovative use of natural gas. Gas lighting displaced candles, whale oil, camphine burning fluid (a blend of turpentine and alcohol) lamps, lamps and kerosene lamps, and came before the invention of electric lighting, and gas cooking and heating.

Laclede Gas Light Co was chartered in Missouri on March 2, 1857. In 1905, North American Company, a public utilities conglomerate, acquired St. Louis United Railways, the consolidated streetcar company in St. Louis, which operated as St. Louis Transit Company.  North American reported they owned Union Electric and Laclede Gas  See Streetcars in St. Louis.

In 1909, North American decided to sell Laclede Gas after lawyers advised they might be in violation of Missouri’s antitrust law.  American Light and Traction was under consideration as a possible buyer, but they were outbid by a consortium of St. Louis capitalists led by GH Walker and Adolphus Busch.  They paid $7MM for the seven elevenths of outstanding shares owned by North American.  Walker was a broker who planned to resell his shares.  Busch’s share was $1MM.

See also
 Erastus Wells, an early president of the company
 Spire Inc — formerly The Laclede Group Inc.

References

Sources
  Beck, Bill (2007). Laclede Gas and St. Louis: 150 Years Working Together, 1857-2007, Laclede Gas Company.

External links
 Laclede Gas Company website

Natural gas companies of the United States
Energy infrastructure in Missouri
Companies based in St. Louis
American companies established in 1857
Energy companies established in 1857
Non-renewable resource companies established in 1857
1857 establishments in Missouri
Former components of the Dow Jones Industrial Average